Quanshan is a town of Minle County in a large oasis of the Gobi Desert in east-central Gansu province, China, located  northeast of the county seat. , it has one residential community and 12 villages under its administration.

See also
List of township-level divisions of Gansu

References

Township-level divisions of Gansu